La Chapelle-Gaugain is a former commune in the Sarthe department in the Pays de la Loire region in north-western France. On 1 January 2017, it was merged into the new commune Loir en Vallée. Its population was 285 in 2019.

See also
Communes of the Sarthe department

References

Former communes of Sarthe